The 2013 World Short Track Speed Skating Championships took place from 8 to 10 March 2013 at the Főnix Hall in Debrecen, Hungary. They were the 38th World Short Track Speed Skating Championships and the first to be held in Hungary.

Schedule
The preliminary schedule of the event is the following:

Results
* First place is awarded 34 points, second is awarded 21 points, third is awarded 13 points, fourth is awarded 8 points, fifth is awarded 5 points, sixth is awarded 3 points, seventh is awarded 2 points, and eighth is awarded 1 point in each race, to determine to the overall world champion. Points are only awarded to the athletes that have taken part in the final of each race. The leader after the first 1000 m in the 3000 m super-final is awarded extra 5 points. Relays do not count for the overall classification.

Men

Women

Medal table

References

External links
Results book

World Short Track Speed Skating Championships
World Short Track, 2013
World Short Track Championships
Sport in Debrecen
March 2013 sports events in Europe
World Short Track Speed Skating Championships